Wallace is a town in Victoria, Australia in the Shire of Moorabool local government area,  north-west of the state capital, Melbourne.

The township was established in the 1880s. Wallace Post Office opened on 2 October 1885 and closed on 26 February 1993.

Wallace was the birthplace of Edmond Hogan, twice Victorian Premier in the 1920s.

References

Towns in Victoria (Australia)